The Chapel of the Resurrection is a  Roman Catholic chapel in the Roman Catholic Archdiocese of New York, located at 276 West 151st Street, Manhattan, New York City.

The Church of the Resurrection was founded in 1907 to serve Catholic residents of Central Harlem. This parish was consolidated with the Church of St. Charles Borromeo. and the church building at Resurrection became a chapel of the now larger parish, now called St. Charles Borromeo / Resurrection Chapel.

References 

Roman Catholic churches in Manhattan
Hamilton Heights, Manhattan
Roman Catholic chapels in the United States
Churches in Harlem